Metellina merianae is a spider species found in Europe up to Georgia.  

They most commonly dwell in the entrances of caves but can also be found in burrows and hollow trees. Web structure is specific to each species.  The webs of M. merianae reach up to about 100 squared cm.

See also 
 List of Tetragnathidae species

References

External links 

Tetragnathidae
Spiders of Europe
Spiders of Georgia (country)
Spiders described in 1763
Taxa named by Giovanni Antonio Scopoli